Raju Peda is a 1954 Indian Telugu-language film, produced and directed by B. A. Subba Rao. It stars N. T. Rama Rao, Lakshmirajyam, S. V. Ranga Rao and Master Sudhakar, with music composed by S. Rajeswara Rao. The film is based on Mark Twain’s 1881 novel, The Prince and the Pauper and was later remade into the Hindi film Raja Aur Runk (1968) and dubbed into Tamil as Aandi Petra Selvan (1957).

Plot
Two identical boys are born on the same day to King Surendra Dev and to a thief Poligadu. Twelve years later, the sick King decides to crown the Prince Narendra Dev. His lookalike Narigadu tortured by his father for refusing to beg, leaves home without informing his mother Achi and sister Malli. He is caught by the palace guards, but is saved by the Prince. They exchange clothes and find that they look identical. Narigadu falls asleep on the Prince's bed. Mistaking him for Narigadu, the guards throw the prince out. Thus they accidentally exchange places.

Soon the prince leaves Poligadu's house. Sudhir, a valiant soldier who is in love with Malli, takes care of him. Meanwhile, the king dies. The army commander Vikram Dev plots to usurp the kingdom. He learns the truth about Narigadu and compels him to act as the prince. He also plots to kill the real prince, but Poligadu and Sudhir thwart his plan. In the fight that follows, Poligadu kills Vikram. Narendra Dev is crowned as the king. He orders Poligadu and his family to stay with him in the palace.

Cast
 N. T. Rama Rao as Poligadu		
 Lakshmirajyam as Achamma
 S. V. Ranga Rao as Maharaju Surendra Dev
 Relangi as Sudhir
 R. Nageswara Rao as Vikram 
 Dr. Sivaramakrishnaiah as Bhugolam Panthulu 
 V. C. Kamaraju as Vijay
 Lakshmaiah Chowdary as Subedhar
 Chelamaiah Chowdary as Raja Guruvu
 Jaya Rami Reddy as Bhaskar 
 Lakshman Rao as Prabhakar 
 Ammaji as Malli
 T. D. Kusalakumari as dancer
 Master Sudhakar as Narendra Dev & Naarigadu (dual role)

Soundtrack

Telugu
The music of the film was composed by S. Rajeswara Rao. Lyrics were by Tapi Dharma Rao, Aatreya  and Kosaraju. Playback singers are Ghantasala, Madhavapeddi Satyam, Jikki, K. Rani, P. Susheela and T. Sathyavathi.

Tamil
Music for the Tamil version was composed by T. Chalapathi Rao and the lyrics were penned by Kuyilan and Puratchidasan. Playback singers are T. M. Soundararajan, S. C. Krishnan, Jikki, P. Leela, R. Balasaraswathi Devi, M. S. Rajeswari, T. Sathyavathi and Kamala.

Awards
This film was one of N. T. Rama Rao's finest performances, for which he was presented the Rashtrapati Award.

References

External links
 - Song sung by Jikki in Telugu
 - Same song in Tamil
 

1954 films
1950s Telugu-language films
Indian black-and-white films
Telugu films remade in other languages
Films directed by B. A. Subba Rao
Indian drama films
1954 drama films